The 1969 Commonwealth Prime Ministers' Conference was the 17th Meeting of the Heads of Government of the Commonwealth of Nations. It was held in the United Kingdom in January 1969, and was hosted by that country's Prime Minister, Harold Wilson.

Five newly independent member countries participated for the first time: Botswana, Barbados, Lesotho, Mauritius and Swaziland.

On the issue of the rogue colony of Rhodesia, Britain re-committed itself to the policy of No independence before majority rule (NIBMAR) which it had adopted at the last Prime Ministers' conference in September 1966.

Also discussed was the Biafra crisis in Nigeria and discrimination against South Asian communities living in Africa and Black and Asian immigrants living in the UK.

References

External links
Commonwealth Conference - British Pathe (1969) Newsreel

1969
Diplomatic conferences in the United Kingdom
20th-century diplomatic conferences
Commonwealth Prime Ministers' Conference
Commonwealth Prime Ministers' Conference
Commonwealth Prime Ministers' Conference
Commonwealth Prime Ministers' Conference
Events in London
Harold Wilson